The Florida softshell turtle (Apalone ferox) is a species of softshell turtle native to the Southeastern United States.

Geographic range
The Florida softshell turtle is found primarily in the state of Florida, but it also ranges to southern sections of South Carolina, Georgia, and Alabama. It is the only species of softshell turtle whose range spans the entire Florida peninsula. They are native to the southeastern United States. Out of the Trionychidae family, the Florida softshell occupies the smallest range.

Habitat use 
The Florida softshell turtle is a widespread species and occupies almost every freshwater habitat, even tolerating some brackish environments; however, it is not often found in water with strong currents, preferring habitats with slow-moving or still water. These different habitats include swamps, lakes, marshes, wet prairies, small rivers, creeks, and even ponds formed in man-made ditches or sinkholes.

Description
The Florida softshell turtle is a large turtle with a flattened, pancake-like body, a long neck, an elongated head with a long snorkel-like nose, and large webbed feet, each with three claws. While most turtles have hard shells composed of scutes, the Florida softshell has a cartilaginous carapace covered in leathery skin. Ranging from olive green to dark brown, it has the darkest coloration of all the softshell species that inhabit Florida (other species include Apalone mutica calvata and Apalone spinifera aspera). It is also characterized by a white or cream-colored underside. This color pattern is known as countershading and is a form of camouflage to conceal turtles from potential predators. It is also the largest species of softshell turtle found in Florida and all of North America, ranging from 15 to 76 cm (5.9 to 29.9 in) in length. The Florida softshell also exhibits significant sexual size dimorphism. Adult females are often 3-5x larger than males. Males have a carapace length and body weight averaging about 35 cm (14 in) and 2.68 kg (5.9 lb) respectively. However, males tend to have longer tails than their female counterparts (3 cm longer than a female of the same size). Hatchlings have a lighter carapace with yellow and orange markings and a carapacial rim. Stripes in the same color are also found on the face and neck. Their plastron is generally dark in color. As the turtle ages, these colors fade and are lost, resulting in the dark-brown coloration characteristic of adults.

Behavior
The Florida softshell turtle is almost entirely aquatic, only emerging from the water to bask or to lay eggs. In the water, it prefers to bury itself in the sandy/muddy substrate. Like all softshells, it is very fast-moving in water and on land. While this species is omnivorous, its diet consists largely of meat, consuming mainly fish, insects, crustaceans, frogs and mollusks. It may also scavenge.

Reproduction

Males 
The reproductive cycle of male Florida softshell turtles follows a postnuptial pattern, with a cycle of spring mating followed by spermatogenesis in the fall. The male will produce sperm during the fall and store that sperm in the epididymides through the winter. This stored sperm can then be utilized for copulation during the following spring mating season. Evidence suggests that they undergo spermatogenesis every year. Males of this species reach sexual maturity at small sizes (below 0.7 kg), allowing them to begin reproducing quickly following birth. This implies that some males may be able to reproduce as young as two years of age.

Females 
While males consistently reach sexual maturity at small sizes, that size is larger and more variable in females. Some may reach maturity at a plastron length of 24 cm, and others may not mature until they reach a length closer to 30 cm. The onset of sexual maturity will occur anywhere from 5 – 8 years of age. The female nesting season can range anywhere from early April to early August, and incubation lasts an average of 60 – 90 days. In a study examining female reproduction, almost 10% of the females examined in a single breeding season showed signs of inactive ovaries, implying that, unlike males, females may not possess the ability to reproduce every year. Florida softshell females have the ability to produce an average of 4 – 5 egg clutches in a single breeding season, potentially producing a new clutch every three weeks. Florida softshell turtles have one of the highest annual egg production rates of any reptile. The study previously mentioned showed an average of over 20 eggs per clutch, with the largest clutch containing 38 eggs.

Ecology
With a primarily carnivorous diet, adult Florida softshell turtles function as major predators in their aquatic ecosystems. Sitting high on the trophic scale, they generally function as secondary or tertiary consumers. However, alligators have been known to prey on the adults of the Florida softshell turtle, and raptors may take juveniles. Nest predators include the fish crow, foxes, raccoons, skunks, and river otters. At various lakes across the state of Florida (Okeechobee, Apopka, Griffin, and Jesup) scientists have observed Florida softshell females, as well as other turtle species (Pseudemys nelsoni, Kinosternon sp., and Sternotherus odoratus) laying their eggs in American alligator (Alligator mississippiensis) nests during the summer months. While the turtles may utilize vacant nests more often, they have also been known to lay eggs in occupied alligator nests. They use these nests more often in areas with limited nesting habitats and/or during years with heavier precipitation when high water levels and flooding further reduce the number of suitable nesting sites. Despite the Florida softshell's use of alligator nests, studies have shown the highest abundance of Florida softshell turtles to persist in lakes with little to no alligators as well as high primary productivity, suggesting a combination of top-down and bottom-up influences on softshell populations.

Anthropogenic threats 
The Florida softshell turtle is common throughout Florida and other parts of its range. However, wild populations are subject to various threats at the hands of humans. Some of these threats include commercial harvesting for meat, harvesting for the pet trade, and roadway mortalities.

Diet

The Florida softshells are carnivores with their main diet consisting of small snails and fish. They also eat amphibians, insects, and mollusks and some waterfowl. These turtles will hunt, chase, and scavenge for prey.

References

Further reading
Behler, J.L.; King, F.W. (1979). The Audubon Society Field Guide to North AmericanReptiles and Amphibians. New York: Alfred A. Knopf. 743 pp. . (Trionyx ferox, pp. 483–484 + Plates 272, 273).
Boulenger, G.A. (1889). Catalogue of the Chelonians, Rhynchocephalians, and Crocodiles in the British Museum (Natural History). New Edition. London: Trustees of the British Museum (Natural History). (Taylor and Francis, printers). x + 311 pp. + Plates I–III. (Trionyx ferox, p. 259).
Conant, R. (1975). A Field Guide to Reptiles and Amphibians of Eastern and Central North America, Second Edition. Boston: Houghton Mifflin. xviii + 429 pp. + Plates 1–48.  (hardcover),  (paperback). (Trionyx ferox, p. 81 + Plates 6, 12 + Map 35).
Schneider, J.G. (1783). Allgemeine Naturgeschichte der Schildkröten, nebst einem systematischen Verzeichnisse der einzelnen Arten und zwey Kupfern ". Leipzig: J.G. Müller. xlviii + 364 pp. + corrigenda. (Testudo ferox, new species, pp. 330–334). (in German and Latin).
Smith, H.M.; Brodie, E.D., Jr. (1982). Reptiles of North America: A Guide to Field Identification. New York: Golden Press. 240 pp.  (hardcover),  (paperback). (Trionyx ferox, pp. 32–33).
Stejneger, L.; Barbour, T. (1917). A Checklist of North American Amphibians and Reptiles. Cambridge, Massachusetts: Harvard University Press. 125 pp. (Amyda ferox, p. 124).

External links

Apalone ferox, The Reptile Database.

Apalone
Turtles of North America
Turtle, Florida Softshell
Endemic fauna of Florida
Reptiles described in 1783
Taxa named by Johann Gottlob Theaenus Schneider